The 1930 Giro d'Italia was the 18th edition of the Giro d'Italia, organized and sponsored by the newspaper La Gazzetta dello Sport. The race was won by Luigi Marchisio of the Legnano team. Second and third respectively were the Italian riders Luigi Giacobbe and Allegro Grandi.

After the fourth victory (third in a row) of Alfredo Binda in the 1929 edition, organizers paid him 22,500 lire (a sum equal to the prize for the overall winner) to not take part in the race. This edition was the first with stages taking place in Sicily.

Participants

Of the 298 riders that began the Giro d'Italia on 17 May, 126 of them made it to the finish in Milan on 8 June. Riders were allowed to ride on their own or as a member of a team. There were six teams that competed in the race: Bianchi-Pirelli, Dei-Pirelli, Gloria-Hutchinson, Legnano-Pirelli, Maino-Clément, and Prina-Hutchinson.

The peloton was primarily composed of Italians. Four-time winner and reigning champion Alfredo Binda did not compete in this running of the Giro because the organizers felt he was too dominant and paid his team manager 22,500 lire — the same amount as the first place rider would receive that year — to keep Binda off the start list. The field no former winners of the Giro d'Italia. Some notable Italian riders that started the race included Antonio Pesenti, Antonio Negrini, Giuseppe Pancera, and Domenico Piemontesi.

Race overview

As the peloton made its way by the volcanic Mount Etna during stage two, Luigi Marchisio got hit in the eye by some volcanic rock. This prompted him to wear a covering over his eyes for several days after the incident.

Final standings

Stage results

General classification

There were 67 cyclists who had completed all fifteen stages. For these cyclists, the times they had needed in each stage was added up for the general classification. The cyclist with the least accumulated time was the winner. Aristide Cavallini won the prize for best ranked isolati rider in the general classification.

Aftermath

Marchisio, who received medical care on his eye in Palermo, stated later the doctor advised him to abandon the race, but he then said: "Losing my sight is one thing, but not winning the Giro would really have bothered me."

References

Footnotes

Citations

Bibliography

G
Giro d'Italia
Giro d'Italia
Giro d'Italia
Giro d'Italia by year